Robert Frederick Schilling, M.D. (1919– 30 September 2014) was a physician best known for his research on Vitamin B12. Schilling was a Professor Emeritus at the University of Wisconsin. He is the namesake of the Schilling test.

Education and postdoctoral work
Schilling received his medical degree from the University of Wisconsin-Madison in Madison, Wisconsin. He received postdoctoral training at Philadelphia General Hospital in West Philadelphia, Boston City Hospital in Boston, and at University of Wisconsin Hospital in Madison, Wisconsin.

Work with Vitamin B12
His work on detection of radio-cobalt-labeled B12 in the urine led to a test for vitamin B12 absorption named the "Schilling test" in his honor. The Schilling test determines if a patient has pernicious anemia, a disease caused by malabsorption of B12 due to lack of intrinsic factor. The Schilling test in a second stage may also be used as a control test for other causes of malabsorption of Vitamin B12 even if it is bound to intrinsic factor (B12 deficiency which is not pernicious anemia).

References

1919 births
2014 deaths
University of Wisconsin–Madison alumni